Glenn Allan Goerke (May 15, 1931 – November 13, 2015) was an American academic who was President/Chancellor of the University of Houston, the University of Houston–Clear Lake, the University of Houston–Victoria, and Indiana University East.  Goerke also served as an interim chancellor of the University of Houston System. He held an undergraduate degree from Eastern Michigan University, and a doctorate from Michigan State University.

References

External links
UH Through Time Profile

Chancellors of the University of Houston System
Presidents of the University of Houston
Presidents of the University of Houston–Clear Lake
Presidents of the University of Houston–Victoria
Eastern Michigan University alumni
Michigan State University alumni
1931 births
2015 deaths